Shahdara Bagh–Sangla Hill Branch Line is one of several branch lines in Pakistan, operated and maintained by Pakistan Railways. The line begins from Shahdara Bagh Junction station and ends at Sangla Hill Junction station. There are 14 railway stations from Shahdara Bagh Junction to Sangla Hill Junction. The line is important in that it connects Faisalabad with other parts of the country by rail.

Stations
The railway stations on this railway line are:
 Shahdara Bagh Junction
 Missan Kalar
 Qila Sattar Shah
 Bahrianwala Minor
 Chichoki Mallian
 Qila Sheikhupura Junction
 Farooq Abad
 Sachcha Sauda
 Bahalike
 Nawan Pind Halt
 Safdarabad
 Abdullahpur Kolar
 Moman
 Langowal Baruhi Halt
 Sangla Hill Junction

References

5 ft 6 in gauge railways in Pakistan
Railway stations on Shahdara Bagh–Sangla Hill Branch Line